Ahoghill ( or) is a large village and civil parish in County Antrim, Northern Ireland, four miles from Ballymena. It is located in the Mid and East Antrim Borough Council area. It had a population of 3,417 people at the 2011 Census.

In early documents, Ahoghill is referred to as Magherahoghill meaning "the plain of the yew forest."

Demography 
Ahoghill had a population of 3,417 people (1,327 households) at the 2011 Census, an increase of 11.8% on the 2001 Census population of 3,055.

On Census day in 2011:
22.2% were aged under 16 and 12.6% were aged 65 and over
48.8% of the population were male and 51.2% were female
3.8% were from a Catholic background and 90.8% were from a Protestant or other Christian background
3.5% of people aged 16–74 were unemployed

History

Religious revival
The 1859 Revival which swept through Ulster has strong connections with Ahoghill. Thousands of ordinary folk had their lives changed at this time. Especially notable is the reports of men and women weeping in the streets of Ahoghill. On Monday 14 March 1859 a thanksgiving service took place in the new First Ahoghill Presbyterian Meetinghouse at which some of the converts from Connor spoke. It was estimated that 3,000 people attended and the commotion was such that the minister ordered the building to be emptied out of fear of the crowded gallery giving way. The crowd spent upwards of three hours in the rain continuing in prayer and praise. The gallery of First Ahoghill still bears the effects of this event; it is visibly sunken to one side.

Today Ahoghill has three Presbyterian churches, First Ahoghill on Straid Road, Brookside on Brook Street and Trinity on Church Street. There is also St Colmanell's Church of Ireland on Church Street, a Gospel Hall on Glenhugh Road and a Roman Catholic Chapel on Ballynafie road.

The Troubles

On 19 April 1977  William Strathearn (39), a Catholic shop owner was shot and killed by the Ulster Volunteer Force (UVF) while at his home in Ahoghill. The murder was carried out by Billy McCaughey who was a UVF member despite also being a former police officer.

The village has seen frequent sectarian attacks, particularly in 2005 when several Catholic families left after attacks on their homes, and is considered a staunchly loyalist area.

See also UDA South East Antrim Brigade.

Sport
Ahoghill Thistle F.C, an association football team 
Ahoghill Rovers F.C, an association football team
St. Mary's GAC and Clooney Gaels GAC, Gaelic sports clubs.

See also 
List of villages in Northern Ireland
List of civil parishes in County Antrim

References

Culture Northern Ireland

Villages in County Antrim
Civil parishes of County Antrim